The Unité d'habitation (Housing Unit) is a modernist residential housing typology developed by Le Corbusier, with the collaboration of painter-architect Nadir Afonso. It formed the basis of several housing developments throughout Europe designed by Le Corbusier and sharing the same name.

The most famous of these buildings is located in the southern part of Marseille, France. It was added to the UNESCO World Heritage List in 2016 because of its importance to the development of modernist architecture, along with 16 other works by Le Corbusier. It is also designated a historic monument by the French Ministry of Culture. It was damaged by fire on February 9, 2012.

History
In 1920, Le Corbusier started to develop the Unité d'Habitation type, which became influential in 20th century modernism and contemporary residential design in Europe.
The first realizations were built in Paris and Marseille in the 1940s as high-rise concrete structures. During construction of the Marseille building, a few model apartments were built and furnished for visitors as an exhibition. 

In the 1980s a team from ETH Zurich surveyed several apartments in Marseille and built several full-scale models for exhibitions in Paris, Karlsruhe, Tokyo and New York. In 1986 a full-scale model was constructed at the Badischer Kunstverein by Gernot Bayne based on the survey of Ruggero Tropeano. The same model was then on display at Centre Pompidou. A full scale original kitchen, stairs, and other parts of the apartments are stored and displayed in several museum collections around the world.  The Museum of Modern Art (MoMA) in New York acquired a complete kitchen in 2013.
In 2007 students built a structurally correct full-scale model inside the museum "Cité de l'Architecture et du Patrimoine" in Paris. Unité d'habitation model apartments have been rebuilt in exhibitions or renovated in their historic style.

La Cité Radieuse, Marseille 
The first and most famous of the Unité d'Habitation buildings is in Marseille, France, and was built between 1947 and 1952. One of Le Corbusier's most famous works, it proved enormously influential and is often cited as the initial inspiration for the Brutalist architectural style and philosophy.

The Marseille building, developed with Le Corbusier's designers Shadrach Woods and George Candilis, comprises 337 apartments of 23 different layouts across 12 stories, all suspended on large pilotis.  The building also incorporates shops including an architectural bookshop, a rooftop gallery, educational facilities, a hotel that is open to the public, and a restaurant, "Le Ventre de l'Architecte" ("The Belly of the Architect"). The building is constructed in béton brut (rough-cast concrete), as the hoped-for steel frame proved too expensive due to the post-war steel shortage.

Inside, wide corridors ("streets in the sky") run along the central long axis of every third floor of the building. Each apartment lies on two levels, such that the room on one side of a corridor belongs to the apartment that is mostly below the corridor floor, while that on the opposite side belongs to the apartment above. On those floors without corridors, the apartments stretch from one side of the building to the other, and each has a balcony on the western side. 

The flat roof is designed as a communal terrace with sculptural ventilation stacks, a running track, and a shallow paddling pool for children. There is also a children's art school in the atelier. The roof, where a number of theatrical performances have taken place, was renovated in 2010, and since 2013 it has hosted an exhibition center called the MaMo. The roof has unobstructed views of the Mediterranean Sea and Marseille.

According to Peter Blake, members of CIAM held a "great celebration" for the building's opening on its roof, on a summer evening in 1953. "Architects from every part of the world attended", including Walter Gropius, who said at the event: "Any architect who does not find this building beautiful, had better lay down his pencil."

Le Corbusier's design was criticised by US architect Peter Blake for having small children's rooms, some without windows. Unlike many of the blocks it inspired, which lack the original's generous proportions, communal facilities and parkland setting, the Unité is popular with its residents and is now mainly occupied by upper middle-class professionals.

Interiors 
The apartments were equipped with built-in furniture, and specially designed storage walls with various cupboards with sliding doors, which were designed by Charlotte Perriand in collaboration with Atelier Le Corbusier. Additionally Perriand collaborated on the design of the apartment kitchens, 321 of the 337 units were equipped with the Cuisine Atelier Le Corbusier, type 1 kitchens, many of which are still in place due to their efficient use of space. The steel stairs and the aluminium kitchen counters were designed by Jean Prouvé. Unité d'habitation model apartments have been renovated in the individual historic Unité buildings as well as rebuilt in exhibitions around the world.

Other buildings and influences 
In the block's planning, the architect drew on his study of a Soviet communal housing project, the Narkomfin Building in Moscow, designed by the architect Moisei Ginzburg and completed in 1932.

Le Corbusier's design for utopian high density housing for cities was repeated in four more buildings with the same name and a very similar design:
 Unité d'Habitation of Nantes-Rezé in 1955, 
 Unité d'Habitation of Berlin in 1957, 
 Unité d'Habitation of Briey in 1963, 
 Unité d'Habitation of Firminy-Vert in 1965.

All were oriented with the building's long axis running north–south, so the units face east and west.

The replacement of steel by rough-cast concrete (béton brut) was a key element that seeded the Brutalist Movement. The Unité d'Habitation inspired many brutalist housing complexes. In England such buildings include the Alton West estate in Roehampton, London,  and Park Hill in Sheffield, both of which have attracted much negative criticism. More successful English incarnations of the Unité include Chamberlin, Powell and Bon's Barbican Estate (completed 1982), Gordon Tait's Samuda Estate, Isle of Dogs (1965), Ernő Goldfinger's Balfron Tower (1967), and Trellick Tower (1972), all in London. The triple-level roof garden of Great Arthur House (1957) inspired by Le Corbusier's Unité d'Habitation is a fine vantage point towards St Paul's Cathedral and the Barbican Estate and has panoramic views across London. Roof terrace for the tenants was furnished with a decorative pool, seats and plant boxes. The crowning glory is a distinctive concrete canopy and pergola. The estate was popular with professionals such as doctors and is still a self-sufficient ‘urban village’. It is seen as the most successful of England's housing developments from the early 1950s. Designed by Chamberlin, Powell and Bon.

The apartment building "Polska Akademia Nauk" (20 Wiejska Street, Warsaw, Poland) was inspired by Le Corbusier's principles. The architect was Jerzy Gieysztor and the building was completed in 1964. Among Central European countries, it is unique for its period. It is an abstract sculptural building that floats over anthropomorphic concrete pillars (pilotis). All its apartments are spacious, there is an indoor shopping mall, and the roof terrace has a swimming pool. This building was also inspired by the Polish pavilion from the 1937 World Expo in Paris, especially the sandstone wall relief and the entrance roof with round holes. Other Polish buildings inspired by the Unité d'Habitation include the Za Żelazną Bramą Housing Estate (Behind the Iron Gate) in Warsaw, and Superjednostka in Katowice, built in the 1970s.

The College of Building and Printing (finished 1964, 13 floors), and the Charles Oakley Building, (finished 1963, 7 floors), both of the City of Glasgow College, Scotland, were designed in the late 1950s by architect Peter Williams. They are non-residential lecturing and office blocks that differ greatly from Le Corbusier's Unité d'Habitation, inside and outside. Yet the roof terrace of the Unité d'Habitation in Marseille inspired Peter Williams to design the rooftops of these college buildings with recreational facilities. The buildings are now a hotel and a student residence. 

Other examples of buildings that drew inspiration from Le Corbusier's Unité d'Habitation in Marseille are:
 A building (1954) in Vukovarska street in Zagreb, designed by architect Drago Galić.
 The Super Andrija building (1973) designed by architect Miroslav Cantinelli (Siget, Novi Zagreb, Siget Street 18) and The Mamutica (Mammoth) building (1974) designed by architects Đuro Mirković and Nevenka Postružnik (Travno, Novi Zagreb, Božidara Magovca Street 3-63). 
 The fire-station in the Boulevard Masséna, Paris, designed by architect Jean Willerval and completed in 1971. The roof terrace has a tennis court. There is a swimming pool on the ground floor.
 The Reserve Square Complex in Cleveland, Ohio, built 1969–1973.
 The Riverside Plaza in Minneapolis, Minnesota, which opened in 1973. Its brutalist design and multi-colored panels were influenced by the Unité d'Habitation.
 The Akbar Hotel in Chanakyapuri, New Delhi was designed by Shiv Nath Prasad and constructed from 1965-69. It shares many elements.

See also 
 Plattenbau
 Tower block
 University Apartments (Chicago, Illinois)

References

External links

 Essay on the Unité d'Habitation in the Financial Times
 Official website
 

Le Corbusier buildings
Brutalist architecture